Jeantet is a French surname that may refer to
Claude Jeantet (1902–1982), French journalist and far right politician
Gabriel Jeantet (1906–1978), French far right activist and journalist, brother of Claude
Louis Jeantet (1897–1981), French businessman 
Louis-Jeantet Foundation
Louis-Jeantet Prize for Medicine

French-language surnames